The 2023 Fort Worth mayoral election will be held on May 6, 2023, with a runoff held later if no candidate receives more than 50% of the vote. It will elect the mayor of Fort Worth, Texas. The election will be officially nonpartisan. Incumbent Republican mayor Mattie Parker is running for re-election to a second term in office.

Candidates

Declared 
 Ken Bowens Jr., entrepreneur (Party affiliation: Independent)
 Jennifer Castillo, realtor
 Alyson Kennedy, cashier and perennial candidate (Party affiliation: Socialist Workers)
 Mattie Parker, incumbent mayor (Party affiliation: Republican)
 Chris Rector, author and candidate in 2021
 Adrian Smith, veteran

Declined 
 Ramon Romero, state representative (Party affiliation: Democratic)

Results

References

Mayoral elections in Fort Worth, Texas
2023 Texas elections
Fort Worth, Texas